Chinthurst Hill is a   Local Nature Reserve south of Guildford in Surrey. It is owned by Surrey County Council and managed by Surrey Wildlife Trust. Chinthurst Hill Tower is a Grade II Scheduled Monument.

The hill has woodland and dry acid grassland. There are woodland flowering plants such as wood anemone, yellow archangel, wood forget-me-not, red campion, common figwort, butcher’s broom and lady’s smock.

There is access from Kings Road.

References

Surrey Wildlife Trust
Local Nature Reserves in Surrey
Locations in Guildford